Lac La Biche County is a specialized municipality within Division No. 12 in northern Alberta, Canada. It was established through the amalgamation of the Town of Lac La Biche and Lakeland County in 2007.

History 
Lac La Biche County was originally established as a municipal district on August 1, 2007 through the amalgamation of Lakeland County with the Town of Lac La Biche. Its predecessor municipal district, Lakeland County, was originally incorporated on July 1, 1998, formed from the northwestern part of the Municipal District of Bonnyville No. 87. Lac La Biche County converted from municipal district status to specialized municipality status on January 1, 2018.

Geography 
Lac La Biche County is in northeast Alberta. It borders the Regional Municipality (RM) of Wood Buffalo to the north; the Municipal District (MD) of Bonnyville No. 87 to the east (including the Cold Lake Air Weapons Range); the County of St. Paul No. 19 and Smoky Lake County to the south; the Kikino Metis Settlement and the Buffalo Lake Metis Settlement to the southwest; and Athabasca County and the MD of Opportunity No. 17 to the west. The eponymous lake, Lac la Biche, is in the southwest portion of Lac La Biche County while the Athabasca River forms the municipal boundary between it and the MD of Opportunity No. 17. Other water bodies include Beaver Lake, Pinehurst Lake, Seibert Lake, Touchwood Lake, and Winefred Lake (also partially within the RM of Wood Buffalo and the MD of Bonnyville No. 87).

Communities and localities 
The following urban municipalities are surrounded by Lac La Biche County.
Cities
none
Towns
none
Villages
none
Summer villages
none

The following hamlets are located within Lac La Biche County.
Hamlets
Beaver Lake
Hylo
Lac La Biche (dissolved from town status in the 2007 amalgamation, location of municipal office)
Plamondon (dissolved from village status in 2002)
Venice

The following localities are located within Lac La Biche County.
Localities

Avenir
Barnegat
Behan
Bone Town (designated place)
Brièreville
Craigend
Deer Ridge Park Subdivision
Elinor Lake Subdivision
Fork Lake
Helina
Imperial Mills
Lac La Biche Mission
Lakeview Estates
Margie

Mile West Trailer Park
Noral
Normandeau
Owl River
Pelican Portage
Philomena
Pine Lane Trailer Court
Pitlochrie
Rich Lake
Rossian or Russian Colony (designated place)
Snug Cove
Sunset Bay
Tweedie

The Lac La Biche Settlement is also within Lac La Biche County.

First Nations have the following Indian reserves within Lac La Biche County.
Indian reserves
Beaver Lake 131
Heart Lake 167
White Fish Lake 128 (portion, with balance split between Smoky Lake County and the County of St. Paul No. 19)

Demographics 

The population of Lac La Biche County according to its 2019 municipal census is 8,654, a  change from its 2016 municipal census population of 8,544. The 2019 and 2016 municipal censuses also counted temporary residents. In 2019, 982 temporary residents were counted in comparison to 987 in 2016.

In the 2016 Census of Population conducted by Statistics Canada, Lac La Biche County had a population of 8,330 living in 3,076 of its 3,998 total private dwellings, a  change from its 2011 population of 8,402.

Economy 

Lac La Biche County's economy is based on the oil and gas industry, agriculture, and tourism. Some sawmills are also present.

Attractions 
The following provincial protected areas are within Lac La Biche County.
Crow Lake Provincial Park
Lakeland Provincial Park
Sir Winston Churchill Provincial Park

Other attractions include Lac La Biche Mission, the Lac La Biche Golf and Country Club, and the following campgrounds.

Diesel Own Hoot Cabins & Campgrounds
Elinor Lake Resort
Fish’N Friends Beaver Lake Campground
Fork Lake
Kinsmen Park Beaver Lake Group Camp Area

Plamondon White Sands
Spruce Point Resort
Steepbank Wilderness Resort
Young's Beach Campground

Community halls in Lac La Biche County include Craigend, Hylo, Owl River, Plamondon, and Rich Lake.

Infrastructure

Transportation 
Air
Numerous carriers offer scheduled charter flights out of the airport. Alberta Air Spray Wildfire protection also uses the airstrip as a base accommodating large water tankers.

Rail
A rail line bisects Lac La Biche County, running through the hamlets of Hylo, Venice, and Lac La Biche. The rail line is operated by Canadian National.

Roads
The following provincial highways service Lac La Biche County.

 (Veterans Memorial Highway)
 (Northern Woods and Water Route)

Education 
Northern Lights School Division No. 69
 Vera M Welsh Elementary (K-3)
 Aurora Middle School (4-8)
 J.A. Williams High School (9-12)
 Off Campus High School
 Portage College
Lakeland Catholic Schools
 Light of Christ Catholic School
Conseil Centre-Est
École Sainte-Catherine (K-3)

Media 
Newspapers
Lac La Biche County is served by the weekly Lac La Biche Post and the Town and Country.

Radio
Two FM radio stations broadcast out of Lac La Biche – BOOM (CILB FM 103.5) and Aboriginal Radio (CFWE FM 89.9).

See also 
List of communities in Alberta
List of municipal districts in Alberta

References

External links 

 
2007 establishments in Alberta
Specialized municipalities in Alberta